Leah Greenberg  is an American political activist and co-founder of the progressive non-profit organization, Indivisible. She is co-author of We Are Indivisible: A Blueprint for Democracy After Trump, published in 2019. Greenberg, along with Indivisible co-founder, Ezra Levin,  was named by Time in 2019 as one of Times 100 most influential people in the world.  She and Levin were selected by Politico in 2017  and GQ in 2018 for their annual lists of most powerful and influential people in Washington DC. She is currently the co-Executive Director of Indivisible.

Early life and education 
Greenberg was raised in Chevy Chase, Maryland. She is Jewish. She graduated from Carleton College in 2008 with a Bachelor of Arts Degree. She later studied at Tufts University, where she received a master's degree in Law and Diplomacy.

Career
Greenberg began her career working for the philanthropic foundation, Humanity United, where she  managed projects to combat human trafficking and slavery. She was an Advisor on human trafficking at the State Department's, Quadrennial Diplomacy and Development Review and later was hired as a staff assistant in the Office of Congressman Tom Perriello of Virginia. Greenberg was the policy director for Perriello's gubernatorial campaign in 2017.

Greenberg, Ezra Levin,  Jeremy Haile, and Angel Padilla, all former Congressional staffers, created the online publication  Indivisible: A Practical Guide for Resisting the Trump Agenda in late 2016 in response to the election of Donald Trump as President of the United States. The guide went viral and the project quickly became a progressive movement.  Levin and Greenberg created a website and encouraged supporters to form their own local chapters. 

In February, 2017, the Indivisible co-founders formed a 501(c) organization, with Levin designated as Indivisible's first President and Greenberg as Vice-President.

Awards and recognition
 2017 Greenberg and Levin were ranked #2 on the Politico 50 list of top thinkers and visionaries transforming American politics 
 2018 Greenberg and Levin named one of GQs 50 most powerful people in Trump's Washington
 2019 Named one of Time magazine's 100 most influential people in the world

Selected publications

References 

The Fletcher School at Tufts University alumni
Carleton College alumni
American political activists
20th-century American Jews
Living people
1987 births
21st-century American Jews